Tactusa flavoniger is a moth of the family Erebidae first described by Michael Fibiger in 2010. It is known from Laos, in Southeast Asia.

Description
The wingspan is about 14 mm.

The ground colour of the forewing is yellowish, with an acutely angled blackish, triangular patch in the upper medial area and a black subterminal area. Only the subterminal and terminal lines are marked, the former inwardly outlined by yellow and the latter by interneural black spots.

The hindwing is dark grey, with an indistinct discal spot and the underside is unicolorous grey.

References

Micronoctuini
Taxa named by Michael Fibiger
Moths described in 2010
Moths of Asia